González is a town and municipality in the Colombian Department of Cesar.

References

External links
 Government of Cesar: González

Municipalities of Cesar Department